Mohit Grewal is an Indian freestyle wrestler, who competes in the 125 kg category. He won a bronze medal in the 2022 Birmingham Commonwealth Games.

Career

2022 Commonwealth Games 
After a win against Alexios Kaoslidis of Cyprus in the Quarterfinals, he was knocked out by Amarveer Dhesi of Canada in the Semi-Finals. Grewal then went on to win the Bronze Medal in the bronze medal match against Aaron Johnson of Jamaica.

International competitions

Commonwealth Games

References

Living people
Indian male sport wrestlers
1999 births
Sport wrestlers from Haryana
Wrestlers at the 2022 Commonwealth Games
Commonwealth Games bronze medallists for India
Commonwealth Games medallists in wrestling
20th-century Indian people
21st-century Indian people
Medallists at the 2022 Commonwealth Games